Bukit Panjang is a planning area and residential town located in the West Region of Singapore. A portion of this town is situated on a low-lying elongated hill. The planning area is bounded by Bukit Batok to the west, Choa Chu Kang to the northwest, Sungei Kadut to the north, the Central Water Catchment to the east and Bukit Timah to the south. Bukit Panjang New Town is located at the northern portion of the planning area. Bukit Panjang has an average elevation of 36m/118 ft.

The town is categorised into seven subzones, namely Jelebu, Bangkit, Fajar, Saujana, Senja, Dairy Farm and Nature Reserve.

Etymology
Bukit Panjang means "long hill" in Malay. The roads in the town are named after old 60s kampung tracks (Lorong Petir, Lorong Pending, Jalan Fajar, Jalan Senja) which used to ply the area.

History
Bukit Panjang is a suburban town in western Singapore. Before redevelopment, Kampong Bukit Panjang used to exist in the area. Initially, instead of using the original place name, Bukit Panjang, there were plans to open up the new town using the name, Zhenghua. However, Bukit Panjang was quickly reinstated following complaints. Development of the town and advanced earthworks begun on 15 June 1981. HDB flats rose up by 20 May 1985, but only Blocks 1xx and 2xx were built so far. Neighbourhood 4 was up and running by 1989, and followed by Neighbourhood 5 and 6 which was the recent ones since 1995.

Administration
The Bukit Panjang area comes under the administrative lead of the Holland-Bukit Panjang Town Council, which oversees the management and maintenance of the many apartments (HDB flats) and commercial units in Bukit Panjang. Its chairman is Liang Eng Hwa.

Housing, amenities, and attractions

The town consists of a mixture of old and new blocks of flats, condominiums and private housing. To date, there are three community centres, namely Bukit Panjang Community Club, Zhenghua Community Centre, and Senja-Cashew Community Club, which serve the entertainment, recreational, and educational needs of residents.Bukit Panjang Plaza is one of the well-known malls in Bukit Panjang. It is located in the heart of Bukit Panjang town and is near Bukit Panjang LRT Station, Bukit Panjang MRT Station and Bukit Panjang Bus Interchange. Located on Jelebu Road, the mall has been expanded twice throughout its existence to include more shops in the building. The mall is owned by CapitaRetail which is another retail-based REIT by CapitaLand. The mall houses the Bukit Panjang Public Library as well as a NTUC FairPrice Finest supermarket.

Hillion Mall is another well-known mall in Bukit Panjang, located along Petir Road. It is one of the more recent commercial facilities, which completed construction and was opened to the public on 24 February 2017. It is part of the Bukit Panjang Integrated Transport Hub, which shares the building with the Bukit Panjang Bus Interchange, and directly links to the Bukit Panjang MRT/LRT station through an underpass and above-ground link way respectively.

There are other smaller commercial buildings equipped with food courts, supermarkets, and other basic shops to meet the basic necessities of the residents. They are commonly located within HDB estates or small standalone buildings. Some of the more iconic buildings include Junction 10 located along Woodlands Road, Fajar Shopping Centre located along Fajar Road, Greenridge Shopping Centre located along Jelapang Road, and the Bukit Panjang Neighbourhood Centre located along Bangkit Road.

Within the neighbourhood consists of two hawker centres; the Bukit Panjang Hawker Centre and Market and the Senja Hawker Centre. The former opened in 2015 while the latter opened in 2022.

A healthcare facility located along Senja Road was opened on 2 October 2021 to house the Bukit Panjang Polyclinic and the Senja Care Home.

The town has two major parks, namely Bukit Panjang Park and Zhenghua Park. Bukit Panjang Park is located adjacent to the Senja-Cashew Community Club and wraps around Pang Sua Pond, a man-made floating wetland. Zhenghua Park, located in the eastern part of Bukit Panjang, consists of a fitness area, gazebos, playgrounds, and a 2.5-kilometre cycling and jogging track that runs parallel to the Bukit Timah Expressway.

Education
Bukit Panjang has both primary and secondary schools within the neighbourhood, as well as other private institutions.

Primary schools 
 Beacon Primary School
 Bukit Panjang Primary School
 CHIJ Our Lady Queen of Peace
 Greenridge Primary School
 West Spring Primary School
 West View Primary School
 Zhenghua Primary School

Secondary schools 
 Assumption English School
 Assumption Pathway School
 Greenridge Secondary School
 West Spring Secondary School
 Zhenghua Secondary School

Private institutions 

 German European School Singapore
 St Francis Methodist School
 Trinity Theological College
 St Francis Xavier Major Seminary

Transportation

Road

Bukit Panjang is bounded by two of Singapore's expressways — the Bukit Timah Expressway (BKE) and Kranji Expressway (KJE). The BKE is accessible via Bukit Panjang Road and Dairy Farm Road, while the KJE is accessible via Woodlands Road and Senja Road.

Bukit Panjang also has a ring road running through the various parts of Bukit Panjang, the Bukit Panjang Ring Road. It acts as a feeder to the main arterial roads in the town.

Bus
The public bus system is predominantly run by SMRT Buses. Of the SMRT buses based in Bukit Panjang, some are smaller feeder bus services that serve the various areas of the neighbourhood, while the rest are long-distance trunk services that serve as a mode of transport to other towns and to the city centre. Bus services start and end at Bukit Panjang Bus Interchange.

Rail

The driverless and fully automated Bukit Panjang LRT line was completed on 11 June 1999 at a cost of S$285 million. The rail line was intended to serve the growing town and act as a replacement to the many buses employed through the town, especially during rush hours. Originally opening with 14 stations, Ten Mile Junction station permanently closed in 2019 after sighting low ridership, bringing the number to 13.

Several petitions were presented by the residents of Bukit Panjang protesting the decision by SMRT to replace the buses in Bukit Panjang with the LRT system. Some of the complaints were related to the fact that people preferred the previous bus system that covered most parts of the Bukit Panjang neighbourhoods such as bus service 190 and 972. The previous bus system was viewed as more efficient because it had many bus stops within walking distance; the LRT system has only 13 stations that are spaced hundreds of meters apart.

The LRT system is expected to go through a major upgrading programme that is due to be completed by 2024. The programme will bring about a new signalling system, better condition monitoring, new power rails system and 19 new light rail vehicles.

The Bukit Panjang MRT station on the Downtown line opened on 27 December 2015. It provides Bukit Panjang residents with direct train access to the Downtown Core.

Cycling 

There is a total of 8.5km-worth of cycling paths around Bukit Panjang to facilitate active mobility as part of the Land Transport Authority's Walk-Cycle-Ride initiative. The first batch of cycling paths was constructed along Petir Road in 2018 by the Holland-Bukit Panjang Town Council. The network has since expanded to cover areas such as Fajar, Bangkit, Jelapang and Senja. Together with the Pang Sua Park Connector, Bukit Panjang Park Connector and Bukit Panjang (Woodlands Road to KJE) Park Connector, the cycling paths form the backbone of the town's 16km cycling network.

Politics 
Bukit Panjang is politically divided into two constituencies, namely the Bukit Panjang Single Member Constituency and the Cashew and Zhenghua wards of the Holland-Bukit Timah Group Representation Constituency.

Bukit Panjang SMC mainly consists of the Pending, Bangkit and Fajar areas. Its Member of Parliament is Liang Eng Hwa.

Senja, Segar, and Jelapang are located in Zhenghua ward of Holland-Bukit Timah GRC where its Member of Parliament is Edward Chia. Petir, Gangsa and Chestnut areas belong to the Cashew division of Holland-Bukit Timah GRC with its Member of Parliament being Vivian Balakrishnan.

References
 Victor R Savage, Brenda S A Yeoh (2003), Toponymics - A Study of Singapore Street Names, Eastern Universities Press,

Footnotes

External links
 Zhenghua Park (owned by the National Parks Board of Singapore)
 SMRT Trains (Bukit Panjang LRT)
 Holland-Bukit Panjang Town Council

 
West Region, Singapore
Places in Singapore
New towns in Singapore
Hills of Singapore
New towns started in the 1980s